"Listen to Your Heart" is a song by Swedish rock duo Roxette, which was originally released in Sweden in September 1988 as the second single from the duo's second studio album, Look Sharp! (1988). It was written by Per Gessle with former Gyllene Tider guitarist Mats "M.P." Persson. The song went on to become one of the most successful singles of 1989, reaching number one in both the United States and Canada around November 1989. The track was the first song to reach number one in the US without a commercially released 7-inch single.

"Listen to Your Heart" originally peaked at number 62 in the UK when it was released there in October 1989. However, following the success of "It Must Have Been Love", the track was reissued as a double A-side with "Dangerous" in August 1990, upon which it reached a chart peak of number six on the UK Singles Chart. In 2005, Belgian trance act DHT released a remixed version of the song, which became a top 10 hit in numerous territories, including France, the Netherlands, the UK and the US.

Composition and style
Per Gessle described "Listen to Your Heart" in the liner notes of Roxette's 1995 greatest hits compilation Don't Bore Us, Get to the Chorus! as "The Big Bad Ballad. This is us trying to recreate that overblown American FM-rock sound to the point where it almost becomes absurd. We really wanted to see how far we could take it." Its lyrics were inspired by a close friend of Gessle's, who was in "emotional turmoil, stuck between an old relationship and a new love. A year later, I call him up in the middle of the night after a few too many glasses of champagne, saying 'Hey, you're number one in the States.'"

According to Ultimate Guitar, the track is an alternative rock ballad, with a moderately slow tempo of 86 beats per minute. The verses are made up of three repeating sequences of Bm–G–A and one additional sequence of Bm–G–Em. The first two choruses are composed of two repetitions of a Bm–G–D–A sequence, followed by an extended sequence of D–A–G–D–Bm–G–A–Bm. The bridge consists of E–C♯m–B–A–B–C♯. The final chorus has been modified up by two full tones it consists of two repetitions of D♯m–B–F♯–C♯, followed by a sequence of F♯–C♯–B–F♯–D♯m–B–C♯–D♯m–B, with the final four notes being repeated for the outro.

Seven different versions of the song were released: the original album version; the "Swedish Single Edit", a slightly edited version included on subsequent greatest hits compilations; the "US Remix", used in the music video; the "AC Mix", which is similar to the 'US remix' but with the guitar in the bridge replaced by a MIDI saxophone; shorter edits of the aforementioned 2 versions, which cut some parts from the last refrain; and the 7-inch single version, which fades out shortly after the last refrain, omitting most of the outro.

Critical reception
In his review of the Look Sharp! album, Bryan Buss from AllMusic felt the song is "bland" and "overproduced". Pan-European magazine Music & Media commented, "Already doing well in the US, this semi-ballad has all the ingredients of a major worldwide hit. This time it seems that the Swedes have beaten the Americans at their own game." In 1990, David Giles from Music Week called it "another big hit", adding that "this single is anything to go by — it made history by reaching number one despite being available on cassette only."

Music video
Doug Freel directed the song's music video, which was filmed during a live performance at the Borgholm Castle ruin on the Swedish Baltic Sea island of Öland. Freel and the video's production crew believed the ruin to have been created especially for the video. Gessle said: "It took some time to convince them that the place actually was for real."

The song has been performed on all of Roxette's concert tours. On the Look Sharp! Live Tour and Join the Joyride! Tour, it was performed in its original, power ballad style, although it has been performed in an acoustic version on all tours since the Crash! Boom! Bang! Tour in 1994.

Formats and track listings
All lyrics were written by Per Gessle. All music was composed by Gessle except "Listen to Your Heart" by Gessle and Mats Persson and "Half a Woman, Half a Shadow" by Marie Fredriksson.

 European 7-inch single (Sweden 1363237 · UK EM108)
 European cassette (UK TCEM108)
 "Listen to Your Heart" – 5:12
 "(I Could Never) Give You Up" – 3:59

 US 7-inch single (B-50223)
 US cassette (4JM-50223)
 "Listen to Your Heart" – 5:12
 "Half a Woman, Half a Shadow" – 3:33

 CD single (UK CDEM108)
 "Listen to Your Heart" (single mix) – 5:14
 "Dressed for Success" (new radio mix) – 3:56
 "(I Could Never) Give You Up" – 3:58
 "Neverending Love" (live) – 3:31

 CD single (1990 UK and Ireland reissue) (UK CDEM149)
 "Listen to Your Heart" (Swedish single version) – 5:12
 "Dangerous" – 3:46
 "Listen to Your Heart" (US mix) – 4:53
 "Dangerous" (U.S. club edit) – 3:46

Credits and personnel
Credits are adapted from the liner notes of The Ballad Hits.

Recording
 Recorded in August 1988 at EMI Studios (Stockholm, Sweden)
 Mixed at EMI Studios (Stockholm, Sweden)

Musicians
 Marie Fredriksson – lead and background vocals
 Per Gessle – background vocals, guitar, mixing
 Per "Pelle" Alsing – drums
 Anders Herrlin – programming, engineering
 Jonas Isacsson – electric guitar
 Clarence Öfwerman – keyboards, programming, production, mixing
 Alar Suurna – mixing, engineering

Charts

Weekly charts

Year-end charts

Certifications

Release history

DHT version

In 2003, Belgian dance group DHT released a cover of "Listen to Your Heart" in Belgium. In late 2004, various mixes of the song reached American clubs and it was released in the United States in November of that year. In 2005, the song became an international club hit after being released as a single from the album of the same name.

By June 2005, the song had reached number one on the US Billboard Hot Dance Airplay chart and the top 10 on the Billboard Hot 100, peaking at number eight in August. Worldwide, the cover reached the top 10 in the Czech Republic, France, and the United Kingdom while becoming a top-twenty success in Australia, Belgium, Denmark, Ireland, and Norway. The same year, the group also released the "Edmée's unplugged vocal edit", an acoustic ballad version of the song, which also received substantial airplay.

Composition
The Furious F. EZ version of the song is in the key of B minor with a tempo of 145 beats per minute.

Track listings
 Belgian CD single (2003)
 "Listen to Your Heart" (DHT Hardbounze single edit) – 3:32
 "Listen to Your Heart" (Furious F. EZ radio edit) – 3:52
 "Listen to Your Heart" (Edmée's unplugged vocal edit) – 4:32

 US CD single (2004)
 "Listen to Your Heart" (Furious F. EZ radio edit) – 3:48
 "Listen to Your Heart" (Hardbounze single edit) – 3:30
 "Listen to Your Heart" (Edmée's unplugged vocal edit) – 4:28
 "Listen to Your Heart" (Furious F. EZ extended mix) – 4:54
 "Listen to Your Heart" (Hardbounze extended mix) – 4:45
 "Listen to Your Heart" (Hardstyle extended mix) – 4:32

Charts

Weekly charts

Year-end charts

Certifications

Release history

Yuridia Spanish version
 "Habla El Corazón", a Spanish version of the song, was released in March 2007 by Mexican artist Yuridia, who covered the track for her second album of the same name. This version peaked at number 44 on the Billboard Hot Latin Songs chart.

References

Roxette songs
1980s ballads
1988 singles
1988 songs
2004 singles
Billboard Hot 100 number-one singles
Cashbox number-one singles
DHT (band) songs
EMI Records singles
Ministry of Sound singles
Music videos shot in Sweden
Music videos showing Sweden
Parlophone singles
Rock ballads
RPM Top Singles number-one singles
Songs written by Per Gessle
Songs written by Mats Persson (musician)
Yuridia songs